Marco Rosafio (born 19 March 1994) is an Italian football player who plays for  club Reggiana. He also holds Swiss citizenship.

Club career
He spent the first 7 seasons of his senior career in the lower Italian divisions, mostly Serie C.

On 12 July 2019 he signed with Serie B club Cittadella.

He made his Serie B debut for Cittadella on 28 September 2019 in a game against Juve Stabia. He substituted Andrea Bussaglia in the 82nd minute.

On 3 August 2021, he signed a two-year contract with Reggiana.

References

External links
 

1994 births
People from Chur
Living people
Italian footballers
Association football midfielders
U.S. Lecce players
Forlì F.C. players
S.S. Monopoli 1966 players
S.S. Juve Stabia players
A.C.R. Messina players
Cavese 1919 players
A.S. Cittadella players
A.C. Reggiana 1919 players
Serie B players
Serie C players
Serie D players